Scott Clinic was a medium secure psychiatric unit located on the outskirts of Rainhill, Merseyside, England. It originated from and operated on the site of the former Rainhill Hospital. The unit was named after the late Dr. Peter Scott and provided facilities for up to 50 patients across 5 wards. Ivy and Hawthorn were the male admission wards, with Myrtle being the male assertive rehabilitation/neurocognitive ward. Olive ward was pre-discharge and Poplar ward was the female ward.

Notable patients
Michael Abram - After stabbing former Beatles member George Harrison multiple times.  Abram was released on 4 July 2002.

References

Hospitals in Merseyside
Psychiatric hospitals in England
Buildings and structures in the Metropolitan Borough of St Helens